This is a list of people who have served as Custos Rotulorum of the North Riding of Yorkshire.

 Sir Leonard Beckwith bef. 1544 – aft. 1547
 Sir Henry Gates bef. 1562–1589
 John Stanhope, 1st Baron Stanhope  1545–1621
 Sir Thomas Posthumous Hoby 1621–1626
 Sir David Foulis, 1st Baronet 1626–1629
 Sir Thomas Posthumous Hoby 1629–1640
 Henry Belasyse 1641–1646
 Interregnum
 Thomas Belasyse, 1st Earl Fauconberg 1660–1700
 Charles Boyle, 2nd Earl of Burlington 1701–1704
 Henry Boyle, 1st Baron Carleton 1704–1715
 Richard Boyle, 3rd Earl of Burlington 1715–1722
 Conyers Darcy 1722
 Richard Boyle, 3rd Earl of Burlington 1722–1733
 Thomas Watson-Wentworth, 1st Marquess of Rockingham 1733–1750
 Charles Watson-Wentworth, 2nd Marquess of Rockingham 1751–1762
 Robert Darcy, 4th Earl of Holderness 1762–1765
 Charles Watson-Wentworth, 2nd Marquess of Rockingham 1765–1782
 Henry Belasyse, 2nd Earl Fauconberg 1782–1802
For later custodes rotulorum, see Lord Lieutenant of the North Riding of Yorkshire.

References
Institute of Historical Research - Custodes Rotulorum 1544-1646
Institute of Historical Research - Custodes Rotulorum 1660-1828

Yorkshire
North Riding of Yorkshire